Elizabeth A. Croft is a Canadian roboticist known for her work on human–robot interaction. She has been announced as the vice president and provost of the University of Victoria.

Education and career
Croft graduated from the University of British Columbia in 1988, she earned a master's degree at the University of Waterloo in 1992, and completed her Ph.D. at the University of Toronto in 1995.

She became a faculty member at the University of British Columbia, where she was a professor in the Department of Mechanical Engineering, Marshall Bauder Professor in Engineering Economics, and associate dean of the Faculty of Applied Science. She chaired the NSERC Council for Women in Science and Engineering from 2010 to 2015. She moved to Monash University in Melbourne, Australia in 2017 as dean of engineering and professor in the Departments of Mechanical and Aerospace Engineering and Electrical and Computer Systems Engineering.

The University of Victoria, in British Columbia, Canada, has announced that, as of July 2022, Croft will become its next vice president academic and provost.

Recognition
Croft was named a Fellow of the American Society of Mechanical Engineers in 2010, and a Fellow of the Australian Academy of Technology and Engineering in 2021. She is also a Fellow of the Institution of Engineers Australia and the Canadian Academy of Engineering.

References

External links

Year of birth missing (living people)
Living people
Canadian mechanical engineers
Canadian roboticists
Canadian women engineers
University of British Columbia alumni
University of Waterloo alumni
University of Toronto alumni
Academic staff of the University of British Columbia
Academic staff of Monash University
Academic staff of the University of Victoria
Fellows of the American Society of Mechanical Engineers
Fellows of the Australian Academy of Technological Sciences and Engineering
Fellows of the Canadian Academy of Engineering
Women roboticists
20th-century Canadian engineers
20th-century women engineers
20th-century Canadian women scientists
21st-century Canadian engineers
21st-century women engineers
21st-century Canadian women scientists